Let It All Go may refer to:

 "Let It All Go" (Rhodes and Birdy song), 2015
 "Let It All Go", a 2011 song by Saves the Day from the album Daybreak